Bachelet is a surname of French origin.

It may refer to:

 Alberto Bachelet (1922–1974), a Chilean Brigadier General, father of Michelle Bachelet
 Alexandre Bachelet (1866–1945), French politician
 Alfred Bachelet (1864–1944), French composer
 Dominique Bachelet, American climate change scientist
 Emile Bachelet, French inventor
 Ido Bachelet, Israeli musician and scientist
 Jean Bachelet (1894–1977), French cinematographer
 Michelle Bachelet (born 1951), former President of Chile, United Nations High Commissioner for Human Rights 
 Pierre Bachelet (1944–2005), French singer-songwriter
 Théodore Bachelet (1820–1879), French historian and musicologist

French-language surnames